Adam Levine (born March 18, 1979) is an American singer and songwriter. He serves as the lead vocalist and rhythm guitarist of the pop rock band Maroon 5. Levine began his musical career in 1994 with the band Kara's Flowers, of which he was the lead vocalist and lead guitarist. After the commercial failure of their only album, The Fourth World, the group was reformed in 2001 as Maroon 5 – with James Valentine replacing him as lead guitarist. In 2002, they released their first album, Songs About Jane, which went multi-platinum in the US; since then, they have released six more albums: It Won't Be Soon Before Long (2007), Hands All Over (2010), Overexposed (2012), V (pronounced: "five") (2014), Red Pill Blues (2017), and Jordi (2021). As part of Maroon 5, Levine has received multiple accolades, including three Grammy Awards.

From 2011 to 2019, Levine was a coach on NBC's reality talent show The Voice. The winners of multiple seasons (1, 5, and 9) belonged to his team. In 2012, Levine made his acting debut as the recurring character Leo Morrison in the second season of the television series American Horror Story. He also appeared in the films Begin Again (2013), Popstar: Never Stop Never Stopping (2016), Fun Mom Dinner and The Clapper (both 2017). Levine launched his eponymous fragrance line in 2013. The same year, he collaborated with Kmart and ShopYourWay.com to develop his menswear collection. He also owns a record label, 222 Records, and a production company, 222 Productions, which produced television shows Sugar and Songland. In 2013, The Hollywood Reporter reported that "sources familiar with his many business dealings" estimated Levine would earn more than $35 million that year.

Early life
Adam Noah Levine was born in Los Angeles to Fredric Levine, the founder of retail chain M. Fredric, and Patsy (née Noah) Levine, an admissions counselor. They divorced when he was seven and Levine underwent therapy. Growing up, he spent weekdays with his mother and weekends with his father. He has a brother Michael, two half-siblings—Sam and Liza Levine—and step-sister Julia Bartolf Milne. Levine's father and maternal grandfather were Jewish, while his maternal grandmother was a Protestant. Levine considers himself Jewish; however, according to The Jewish Chronicle, he is spiritual but not religious. He chose not to have a Bar Mitzvah as a child because of the custom of receiving Bar Mitzvah gifts, explaining: "I felt as though a lot of kids were trying to cash in ... I just don't think it's the most respectful way to deal with God and beliefs and years and years and years of cultural heritage." Levine is a nephew of journalist and author Timothy Noah, and television producer and writer Peter Noah.

Levine describes his family as "very musical" and credits his mother with "start[ing] me out on the path." He also attributes his mother's idols – Simon & Garfunkel, Fleetwood Mac, and The Beatles – to shaping his musical style, calling them "a huge part of my upbringing". Levine attended Brentwood School, where he met Jesse Carmichael and Mickey Madden, his future bandmates. He carried his musical interests to high school, where he states he was "a little rebellious. I didn't want to do the things they were teaching me ... [music] consumed my every thought."

Kara's Flowers
In February 1994, Levine, along with friends Jesse Carmichael, Mickey Madden, and Ryan Dusick formed garage band Kara's Flowers. In 1995, the group played their first gig at the Whisky a Go Go, a nightclub in West Hollywood, California, with Levine performing vocals and guitar. The band was discovered while they were performing in Malibu by independent producer Tommy Allen, who along with his partner John DeNicola, had them record an 11-track album. Owing to a string of industry showcases in Los Angeles, they were signed on to Reprise Records through producer Rob Cavallo.

In August 1997, the band released their first album, titled The Fourth World and also appeared on an episode of the drama series Beverly Hills, 90210. Despite high expectations, it had little success, selling about 5,000 copies. Reprise decided to drop the band after Cavallo's exit from the label. Disappointed with the results of their album, the band broke up. Later, Levine would say of the experience: "Kara's Flowers was just floating up the wall beneath the sticks. Make a record quickly, put it out. No touring base, no nothing. Just try to make it happen right out of the gate and it just doesn't work".

Maroon 5 and mainstream success

After the break up of Kara's Flowers, Levine, along with Carmichael, left Los Angeles to pursue higher studies at Five Towns College in New York. On MTV News, in 2002, he said: "That's when I started waking up to the whole hip-hop, R&B thing. We had friends named Chaos and Shit. It was not Brentwood High". They dropped out after a semester, and reunited with Madden and Dusick to form a band once more. They experimented with several styles, including country and folk, before deciding groove-based music would become their genre. Levine explained the need for a makeover for the band: "We were just so sick of being a typical rock 'n' roll band ... I felt like I needed to look elsewhere for vocal inspiration."  The band put together a demo that was rejected by several labels, before it caught the attention of Octone Records executives James Diener, Ben Berkman, and David Boxenbaum. Following Berkman's advice, the band added a fifth member, James Valentine, and was renamed Maroon 5. In an interview with HitQuarters, Berkman explained that Levine "seemed to be a very shy, shoe-gazing type ... a fifth member could play the guitar to free up the singer [Levine], so he could be the star I perceived him to be".

Around this time, Levine had been working as a writer's assistant on the CBS television show Judging Amy; the program's producer Barbara Hall was his family friend. While on the show, he would spend time writing songs about his ex-girlfriend. These songs were put into Maroon 5's debut album Songs About Jane, which was released in June 2002. The album slowly gained airplay, and eventually became a sleeper hit, selling an estimated 10 million copies and becoming the tenth best-selling album of 2004, two years after its release. In 2005, Maroon 5 won their first Grammy Award, for Best New Artist. The next year, they won the Grammy Award for Best Pop Performance by a Duo or Group with Vocals for the second Songs About Jane single "This Love".

By 2006, the band began recording again, and in May 2007, Maroon 5's second album It Won't Be Soon Before Long was released. Levine described the album as "a vast improvement", explaining: "I think this record is a little more self-confident and powerful lyrically". To support the album, the band performed on a ten-date club tour in which visited small venues in Europe and the United States from April to June 2007. The album and its lead, third and penultimate singles ("Makes Me Wonder", "Won't Go Home Without You" and "If I Never See Your Face Again", respectively) each received Grammy nominations, although only "Makes Me Wonder" secured a win.

After winding down from a world tour in support of It Won't Be Soon Before Long, the band began recording in Switzerland in 2009, in collaboration with record producer and songwriter Robert John "Mutt" Lange. Levine said Lange "worked me harder than anyone ever has". In 2010, Maroon 5 released their third studio album, Hands All Over. The album did not initially meet expectations. In an interview with Los Angeles Times, Levine explained that the album suffered from being "all these disparate ideas and songs that didn't make any sense together". After the moderate success of the album's first three singles, the band released "Moves like Jagger" which Levine classified as "one of those songs that was definitely a risk; it's a bold statement". The single became a worldwide success; it was the ninth-best-selling digital single of 2011 with sales of 8.5 million copies and, the eighth-best-selling digital single of all time. Levine later credited the song with "totally reviving the band".

Since "Moves Like Jagger" was the first time Maroon 5 had collaborated with an outside writer, the band decided to attempt it again on their next album, entitled Overexposed. Its title is supposedly an allusion to Levine's public ubiquity. In an interview with Rolling Stone, he opined that is their most dance-driven album ever, commenting: "It's very much an old-fashioned disco tune. I have a love/hate relationship with it – but mostly I love it". The album and its lead single "Payphone" gave Maroon 5 their second Grammy Award for Best Pop Vocal Album and Best Pop Duo/Group Performance nominations. In support of Overexposed, the band conducted the Overexposed Tour from 2012 to 2013 (with the European leg extending to 2014 due to scheduling conflicts), and also headlined the 2013 Honda Civic Tour, which included The Voice contestant Tony Lucca.

In 2014, Maroon 5 continued their collaboration with Ryan Tedder, Max Martin and others to release their fifth studio album V (pronounced: "five"). Levine acknowledged that they followed the same song-writing process that they tried with Overexposed, saying: "We developed a really nice system on the last record — we found songs we were passionate about, developed them and put our stamp on them ... this time we kept it going but looked for different types of songs." Five singles were released from it. In support of the album, the band undertook the Maroon V Tour, which kicked off with a show in Dallas in February 2015.

In 2007, Levine had stated that he believed Maroon 5 was reaching its peak and might make one more album before disbanding. He was quoted explaining: "Eventually I want to focus on being a completely different person because I don't know if I want to do this into my 40s and 50s and beyond". But in 2010, he dispelled any rumors of the band breaking up, saying:"I love what I do and think that, yes, it might be tiring and complicated at times [but] we don't have any plans on disbanding any time soon". He has also turned down the idea of having a solo career, stating that "there will never be a solo record. I would sooner have another band". On February 10, 2017, Levine received a star on the Hollywood Walk of Fame for his contributions to the recording industry.

Other work

Musical collaborations

Levine has collaborated with several musical artists. In 2005, he was featured on the song "Live Again" by hip-hop duo Ying Yang Twins. The same year, he appeared on Kanye West's album Late Registration, on the third single "Heard 'Em Say", a collaboration Levine called "very pure and very easy". The song was created during an airplane flight that he and West shared, and its refrain was later used for the Maroon 5 song "Nothing Lasts Forever" from It Won't Be Soon Before Long. He also appeared on Alicia Keys' third album Alicia Keys: MTV Unplugged, as part of the cover of The Rolling Stones song "Wild Horses". Around the same time, he featured on fellow Octone Records singer K'naan's single "Bang Bang".

In 2009, he recorded "Gotten", a song for Slash's first solo album Slash (2010).

In February 2010, he was among approximately 80 musicians who sang on the charity-single remake of "We Are the World", called "We Are the World 25 for Haiti".

In 2011, he appeared on the Gym Class Heroes song, "Stereo Hearts". Levine also worked with hip-hop artist 50 Cent on his song "My Life", recording the vocals almost two years before it was released as a single in 2012, which included rapper Eminem.

In 2013, Levine wrote a song with Swedish composer Ludwig Göransson called "My Most Terrible Secret" performed by the cast of Community, in the episode "Intro to Felt Surrogacy".

In 2015, Levine was featured on the song "Painkiller" by Rozzi Crane and the duo, R. City's single "Locked Away".

In 2016, Levine collaborated with The Lonely Island for the song "I'm So Humble", on the soundtrack album Popstar: Never Stop Never Stopping, which they also appeared in the film of the same name.

In April 2019, Levine and 29 other musical acts were featured on the charity single "Earth", which raises climate change awareness. In late 2019, Levine collaborated with American actor and musician Joe Pesci, on his third album Pesci... Still Singing, with two songs "Baby Girl" and a cover of Stevie Wonder's "My Cherie Amour".

In 2020, Levine was featured on two songs "Trust Nobody", with rapper Lil Wayne on his album Funeral and "Same Guy" by Jack Harlow on the album Thats What They All Say.

Levine is also featured as a singer for his band's song "She Will Be Loved" in the music rhythm game, Band Hero. Levine has contributed with two songs for the soundtracks of the John Carney films: "Lost Stars" in Begin Again and "Go Now" in Sing Street.

Television, film and media
Levine has made four notable comic appearances on television. During 2007, he appeared in the 33rd-season premiere of Saturday Night Live in an SNL Digital Short called Iran So Far, performing with Andy Samberg, Fred Armisen and Jake Gyllenhaal. Levine played himself while singing a humorous bridge to a "love song" for Mahmoud Ahmadinejad. In 2008, he performed on Comedy Central's "Night of Too Many Stars". He also had a cameo on Jimmy Kimmel Live! for the night of stars and endorsed Barack Obama in the 2008 Presidential Election. In 2013, he hosted Saturday Night Live and featured alongside Kendrick Lamar on Lonely Island's digital short "YOLO", which parodies the acronym for "You Only Live Once." His hosting was generally disliked by reviewers, who called it "mediocre" and "subpar." He appeared on season 40 of SNL where he played Freddie Mercury and sang a snippet of "Bohemian Rhapsody" in the "Joan Rivers" sketch.

From 2011 to 2019, Levine  served as a contestant judge/coach on the reality talent television show, The Voice. The contestants of his team who won in the series are Javier Colon (season 1), Tessanne Chin (season 5) and Jordan Smith (season 9). The Voice has been credited with reviving Maroon 5's "faltering" career after the sub-par sales of Hands All Over as well as increasing Levine's popularity. According to polling firm E-Poll Market Research, awareness of Levine has nearly tripled since he joined the show. He has also been described as the "breakout" star of the series, with #TeamAdam and @AdamLevine scoring a respective 203,000 and 2.14 million Twitter mentions in the show's third season, higher than all the other coaches. In 2013, The Hollywood Reporter estimated that Levine was paid $10–12 million for each season of The Voice. In May 2019, Levine left the series after sixteen seasons and eight years.

In 2012, Levine appeared as a recurring character in American Horror Story: Asylum, the second season of the television series American Horror Story. He plays Leo Morrison, a newly-wed photographer visiting modern-day Briarcliff Manor, an insane asylum, on honeymoon with his wife, played by Jenna Dewan. The scenes were shot around his band's summer touring schedule. In an interview with E!, he said of his role: "It sounded like so much fun and that's why I wanted to do it ... this sounds, like, hysterical, funny, dark and cool and right up my alley". However, he admitted to not being a fan of the show nor horror genre in general, stating he didn't watch the episodes because "it's just so weird and disturbing".

In June 2012, Levine was cast in the musical romance-drama film Begin Again (originally titled Can a Song Save Your Life?). The film was directed by John Carney and Keira Knightley and Mark Ruffalo acted in the lead roles. In it, he plays Dave Kohl, Knightley's songwriting partner and former boyfriend of five years, who leaves her behind on finding success in the music industry. The film premiered at the 2013 Toronto International Film Festival to generally favorable reviews from critics.

In November 2013, Levine was named People magazine's Sexiest Man Alive, becoming the first singer and the second non-actor (after John F. Kennedy, Jr.) to claim the title. He was ranked No. 41 on Glamour's "Sexiest Men of 2012" list. In 2008, he appeared on People's "Single and Sexy Men" list. He was elected TV's Most Crushworthy Male Reality Host/Judge in a poll held by Zap2it. In April 2012, Shalom Life ranked him Number 7 on its list of "Top 50 Hottest Jewish men in the world". Levine stripped naked for testicular cancer awareness for a centerfold in Cosmopolitan UK's February 2011 issue.

222 Productions
In 2013, Levine started a production company 222 Productions and the first project was Sugar (2018), a YouTube Premium web television series which was inspired by the music video for the Maroon 5 song of the same name. It follows music artists to crash events for unsuspecting fans. The company produced a reality competition series Songland, which premiered on NBC on May 28, 2019, where Levine served as executive producer. The company signed a deal with Wheelhouse Entertainment.

Business ventures and endorsements

In October 2008, Levine collaborated with First Act to create the First Act 222 Guitar, which was fashioned to his specifications. The guitar was sold via Target stores. Two years later he launched his own fashion line, entitled "222", at the Project Trade Show in Las Vegas. The collection features jeans, basic T-shirts and leather jackets. The venture was organized in partnership with his father, Fred Levine (who operates a chain of specialty boutiques), and his cousin, Sami Cooper.

In June 2011, Levine took part in an educational campaign to raise awareness of attention deficit hyperactivity disorder (ADHD). The project, titled "Own It", was created by Shire and organized in collaboration with the Attention Deficit Disorder Association (ADDA), Children and Adults with attention deficit hyperactivity disorder (CHADHD). The project targets people who were previously diagnosed with the disorder, focusing on how it may continue into adulthood. Levine, who himself was diagnosed with ADHD as a teenager, said: "This campaign is important to me because it can help young adults and adults realize that there's a chance they may still have ADHD if they had it as a kid". In connection to this, he wrote an article in ADDitude Magazine about his personal experience with it.

Levine founded his own record label, 222 Records in February 2012. He stated that he was inspired to start the label to sign on Rozzi Crane, an USC music student he discovered through a mutual friend. She became the first singer signed on to the label, followed by Glee actor Matthew Morrison, Mexican artist Diego Boneta, and The Voice season 2 contestant and part of Team Adam, the singer Tony Lucca. It was reported that he was negotiating further with potential distributors, as well as organizing staff, to operate as a full-fledged record company with departments such as marketing, radio and publicity.

In September 2012, Levine was in the Philippines to collaborate with the clothing company Bench; they launched the menswear collection. In January 2013, Levine announced he would be enter a partnership with Sears Holdings to launch a multi-department lifestyle brand of apparel and accessories collections. The company owns Kmart and ShopYourWay, a shopping social platform; it also includes rapper Nicki Minaj in the same contract. The menswear collection was launched on October 1 that year and conducts business via 500 Kmart stores across the US, as well as online. In an official statement, Levine said: "Partnering with ShopYourWay to develop this line was an exciting opportunity for me and I am really looking forward to diving into the process of designing an apparel and accessory collection". In an interview with People, he commented further, "it was cool that they really promoted creative control. I like to be involved with process rather than just phoning it in". Later, Levine became a celebrity spokesperson for Proactiv. In the commercial, Levine shares details about his acne experiences in high school, and promotes Proactiv Plus.

Levine collaborated with ID Perfumes to create his debut eponymous scent. The line was launched at the Premiere Fragrance Installation in Los Angeles in February 2013. The fragrance range, consisting of scents for both for men and women, is sold through Macy's department stores in microphone-shaped bottles. Speaking at its launch, Levine said: "The task was to make something that I would wear. So that was a process and we finally came to a great conclusion and it smells great" The fragrance garnered media attention for contradicting his tweet the previous year, in which he said that he wanted to "put an official ban on celebrity fragrances. Punishable by death from this point forward". In January 2020, Levine announced that he is the new Ambassador of the brand Shure for the wireless earphones and headphones, the Aonic 215 and 50, is available on electronic stores on April 2, 2020.

Artistry

Levine's interest in music started at around ten years of age, when he first started playing the guitar. He found music as an outlet for his feelings, stating: "I picked up a guitar and that was it. I fell so madly in love with it, it's all I did". He performed his first professional gig at The Troubadour when he was twelve, but he was so nervous that he played with his back to the audience. Throughout his childhood, he had a wide range of musical influences, including The Beatles, Fleetwood Mac, The Who, Pearl Jam, Soundgarden, Alice in Chains, and Nirvana, and, in high school, Bob Marley, Bill Withers, Al Green, Stevie Wonder, Marvin Gaye, Phish and Michael Jackson. He has also incorporated elements of The Police and Prince into his music. In an interview with Billboard, he explained the diversity of his influences: "I love every single kind of music ... even the most saccharine, sugary pop song can be the greatest thing ever. But so can a 25-minute crazy avant-garde fusion gnarly Herbie Hancock jam from the '70s".

Levine remembers that listening to "Are You That Somebody?" by Aaliyah convinced him to pursue a more soulful sound than that of the band he was performing with at the time, Kara's Flowers. His move to New York introduced him to a new music scene that involved hip-hop, R&B, gospel and soul music. He took to changing his musical style, extensively emulating Stevie Wonder. Subsequently, Songs About Jane was released, deemed  "bluesy funk" and similar to the sound of English pop rock band Busted. Critics also drew comparisons between Levine and Jamiroquai singer Jay Kay.

While earlier work was deemed "vaguely funky white-soul" and "rock", recent ones have been judged to have a more reggae, anthemic pop sound, evoking comparisons to Coldplay. Levine refuses to fit his music into a genre, saying: "There's so much variety in music, it's silly to belong to a specific club and try to sound a certain way". He considers himself an orthodox lyricist sticking to conventional themes, acknowledging: "Romance, love, the lack thereof are still very big themes. I haven't figured out a way to use everything yet. As a songwriter, I'm still limited to that one thing." He also claims he does not like mincing words, stating in a Rolling Stone interview: "I was so sick of typical lyrics like 'Ooh, baby' and 'I love you' and all this vague shit. I thought the more explicit I got without being totally explicit was a nice approach".

Levine is a tenor, with a 4 octave vocal range and has been noted for his falsettos. Salon wrote: "When he's crooning come-ons, his voice lends the music a satisfying lewdness, a sense of sticky physicality that gives his snaky hooks a pheromonal urgency." In a review of It Won't Be Soon Before Long, Entertainment Weekly described his vocals as "smug, R&B-slick deadpan ... there's a twisted logic to his dispassionate delivery". In another review, Allmusic wrote "he knows that he's a pop guy, somewhat in the tradition of Hall & Oates, but he isn't trying to be retro, he's ... making records that are melodic, stylish, and soulful". In a review of the 2013 Honda Civic Tour, The Boston Globe also commented positively on his on-stage presence, which "exude[s] a sense of up-for-anything playfulness ... combined with a rock solid work ethic and a clear love for their audiences and performing".

Levine's popularity outside of his musical work has seen him tagged as a "stand-alone star," which critics say have pushed other members of Maroon 5 to the backseat, even in their music. Their guitarist Valentine noted that his vocals were a central aspect around which their music revolved. Conversely, others opine that Levine's fame has been a boost to the band, with Paper writing: "Maroon 5 has managed to ebb and flow with the times ... thanks in no small part to their frontman's uncanny ability to be extremely entertaining". Delta Sky described him as "a natural, if slightly neurotic, leading man". He claims that the image was consciously cultivated, explaining: "We talked about it a long time ago and decided I would step out, for us, not for me or my own ego ... We wanted there to be a frontman."

Personal life

In early 2010, while performing at the Sports Illustrated Swimsuit Issue release party in Las Vegas, Levine met Russian Sports Illustrated Swimsuit Issue model Anne Vyalitsyna and they soon began a relationship. They ended the relationship in April 2012 in an "amicable and supportive manner".

In May 2012, Levine began dating Behati Prinsloo, a Namibian Victoria's Secret model. The couple married on July 19, 2014, with Jonah Hill officiating the wedding. Levine and Prinsloo have two daughters, Dusty Rose (born September 21, 2016) and Gio Grace (born February 15, 2018). On January 28, 2023, Levine and Prinsloo had a third child.

Levine, whose brother Michael is gay, is a supporter of same-sex marriage and LGBT rights. In 2011, he made a video on Maroon 5's official YouTube account in support of the It Gets Better Project. In January 2012, he announced that Maroon 5 had changed the location of their post-Grammy Awards show because of the "unnamed Los Angeles restaurant's backing of Proposition 8".

In 2013, Levine was mentioned in a hostile work environment lawsuit filed in Los Angeles Superior Court by an unnamed security guard who claimed that Universal Music Publishing Group's Santa Monica location was "infiltrated with pervasive drug use where you could smell marijuana seeping from various offices and openly used in common areas, and lounges". The guard claimed that when she complained about the cannabis smoke coming from one of the studios, she was told that "it's Adam Levine—if he wants to come to the lobby and do a line of cocaine on the floor, it's OK". In an official statement to The Hollywood Reporter, UMPG (Universal Music Publishing group) described the allegations as "absurd".

In July 2020, Levine and Prinsloo collaborated with Ferrari and Save the Children to raise funds to support U.S. education programs during the COVID-19 pandemic. In 2021, Levine and Prinsloo founded a tequila company called Calirosa. The brand's tequila bottles were made available from December 2021.

Discography

Singles as an artist

Guest appearances

Songwriting credits

Videography

As lead artist

As featured artist

Cameo appearances

Filmography

Film

Television

Web

Other works

Music videos

Producer

Miscellaneous crew

Video games

Awards and nominations

Notes

References

Further reading
 Kimpel, Dan (2006), How They Made It: True Stories of How Music's Biggest Stars Went from Start to Stardom!. Location unknown:Hal Leonard Corporation.

External links

 

 
1979 births
Living people
20th-century American male musicians
20th-century American singers
21st-century American male actors
21st-century American male musicians
21st-century American singers
222 Records artists
A&M Records artists
American male film actors
American male guitarists
American male pop singers
American male singers
American male songwriters
American male television actors
American male voice actors
American neo soul singers
American pop rock singers
American reality television producers
American rock guitarists
American rock singers
American rock songwriters
American tenors
Countertenors
Grammy Award winners
Guitarists from Los Angeles
Interscope Records artists
J Records artists
Jewish American male actors
Jewish American musicians
Jewish American songwriters
Jewish rock musicians
Jewish singers
Judges in American reality television series
American LGBT rights activists
Male actors from California
Male actors from Los Angeles
Maroon 5 members
People from Los Angeles
Record producers from California
Reprise Records artists
Rhythm guitarists
Singers from Los Angeles
Songwriters from California
Television producers from California
People with attention deficit hyperactivity disorder